The 1965 All-SEC football team consisted of American football players selected to the All-Southeastern Conference (SEC) chosen by various selectors for the 1965 NCAA University Division football season.

Offensive selections

Ends 
 Charles Casey, Florida (AP-1, UPI)
 Tommy Tolleson, Alabama (AP-1)
 Rick Kostner, Kentucky (UPI)
Barry Brown, Florida (AP-2)
Pat Hodgson, Georgia (AP-2)

Tackles 

 Sam Ball, Kentucky (AP-1, UPI)
 Dave McCormick, LSU (AP-1, UPI)
Jim Harvey, Ole Miss (AP-2)
Andy Gress, Auburn (AP-2)

Guards 
Stan Hindman, Ole Miss (AP-1, UPI)
Larry Beckman, Florida  (AP-1, UPI)
Doug Davis, Kentucky (AP-2)
Bobby Gratz, Tennessee (AP-2)

Centers 
Paul Crane, Alabama (AP-1, UPI)
Forrest Blue, Auburn (AP-2)

Quarterbacks 

 Steve Spurrier, Florida (College Football Hall of Fame)  (AP-1, UPI)
Steve Sloan, Alabama (AP-2)

Halfbacks 
Steve Bowman, Alabama (AP-1, UPI)
 Rodger Bird, Kentucky (AP-1, UPI)
Joe Labruzzo, LSU (AP-2)
Larry Seiple, Kentucky (AP-2)

Fullbacks
Mike Dennis, Ole Miss (AP-1, UPI)
Hoyle Granger, Miss. St. (AP-2)

Defensive selections

Ends 
Creed Gilmer, Alabama (AP-1, UPI)
Bobby Frazier, Tennessee (AP-1, UPI)
Lynn Matthews, Florida (AP-2)
Lane Wolbe, Vanderbilt (AP-2)

Tackles 
 Jim Urbanek, Ole Miss (AP-1, UPI)
Jack Thornton, Auburn (AP-1)
George Rice, LSU (AP-2)
Dick Lemay, Vanderbilt (AP-2)

Middle guards 
George Patton, Georgia (AP-1, UPI [as DT])
Larry Gagner, Florida (UPI)
Grady Bolton, Miss. St. (AP-2)

Linebackers 
 Frank Emanuel, Tennessee (AP-1, UPI)
 Bill Goss, Tulane  (AP-1, UPI)
 Bill Cody, Auburn (AP-1, UPI)
Tom Fisher, Tennessee (AP-2)
Mike McGraw, Kentucky (AP-2)
Tim Bates, Alabama (AP-2)

Backs 
 Bobby Johns, Alabama (AP-1, UPI)
Lynn Hughes, Georgia (AP-1, UPI)
 Bruce Bennett, Florida (AP-1, UPI)
Marvin Cornelius, Miss. St. (AP-2)
Terry Beadles, Kentucky (AP-2)
Bobby Beaird, Auburn (AP-2)

Key 
AP = Associated Press

UPI = United Press International

Bold = Consensus first-team selection by both AP and UPI

See also
1965 College Football All-America Team

References

1965 Southeastern Conference football season
All-SEC football teams